International Day To Combat Islamophobia is an international observance designated by United Nations in 2022, taking place on 15 March every year in 140 countries worldwide. The date, March 15, was chosen as it is the anniversary of the Christchurch mosque shootings, in which 51 people were killed.

Background 

Islam is the second largest religion in the world after Christianity, with 1.9 billion followers representing 24.9 % of world population. Islamophobia is the fear of, hatred of, or prejudice against Islam or its followers called Muslims.

Throughout history, many incidences of ethnic cleansing of Muslims were reported across the world, most notably the Circassian genocide, the Srebrenica massacre, the Sabra and Shatila massacre, and the ongoing Rohingya and Uyghur genocides. Islamophobia escalated after the September 11 attacks, which caused great distress to Muslims in Europe and the United States.

Official recognition 

On 15 March 2022, the United Nations General Assembly adopted a resolution by consensus which was introduced by Imran Khan, then Prime Minister of Pakistan, on behalf of the Organisation of Islamic Cooperation that proclaimed March 15 as 'International Day to Combat Islamophobia'.

See also

World Hijab Day

References

March observances
Islamophobia, International Day to Combat
Organisation of Islamic Cooperation
Islamophobia
Pakistan and the United Nations
Imran Khan